This is a list of the 13 episodes of series one of Frontline, which first aired in 1994. In series 1, Frontline chronicles the behind-the-scenes workings of a struggling current affairs show competing with dominant players for audience share. The series is shot in mockumentary style.

All of the show's episodes were written, produced and directed by Rob Sitch (Mike Moore), Jane Kennedy (Brooke Vandenberg), Santo Cilauro (Geoffrey Salter)—who also did most of the camera work—and Tom Gleisner.

Cast

Main
 Rob Sitch as Mike Moore, Frontline'''s anchor
 Bruno Lawrence as Brian "Thommo" Thompson, executive producer of Frontline Tiriel Mora as Martin di Stasio, reporter
 Alison Whyte as Emma Ward, the show's producer
 Jane Kennedy as Brooke Vandenberg, reporter
 Anita Cerdic as Domenica Baroni, receptionist
 Santo Cilauro as Geoffrey Salter, weatherman
 Trudy Hellier as Kate Preston, segment producer
 Pip Mushin as Stu O'Halloran, cameraman
 Torquil Neilson as Jason Cotter, sound recorder
 Linda Ross as Shelley Cohen, executive assistant to Brian

Recurring
 Marcus Eyre as Hugh Tabbagh, editor (9 episodes)
 Boris Conley as Elliot Rhodes, Frontline'''s "Friday Night Funnyman" (8 episodes)
 Genevieve Mooy as Jan Whelan, network Head of Publicity (8 episodes)
 Tom Gleisner as Colin Konica, photocopy repairman (6 episodes). Gleisner, one of the show's writers, has cameo appearances in five episodes before having a single line in the second last episode.
 Gerard Kennedy as Ian Farmer, Station Manager (5 episodes)
 Eung Aun Khor as Khor, cleaner (4 episodes)
 Peter Stratford as Bob Cavell, Managing Director of the network (4 episodes)
 Neil Mitchell as himself, radio presenter (3 episodes)

Episodes

References

External links
 Frontline website (Circa 1997)
 Interview with Rob Sitch on the tenth anniversary of Frontline
 Frontline DVDs at the ABC shop online

1994 Australian television seasons